The 2021–22 Yale Bulldogs Men's ice hockey season was the 126th season of play for the program and the 60th season in the ECAC Hockey conference. The Bulldogs represented Yale University and were coached by Keith Allain, in his 15th season.

Season
After ending an unbroken string of 125 years of varsity hockey, Yale returned to the ice looking to put the COVID-19 pandemic in the past. Unfortunately, due in part to missing all of the past season, the Bulldogs were very slow out of the gate and were never really able to find their stride.

Yale lost each of their first six games, however, more concerning was that the team went scoreless in four of those contests. Their offence did pick up a bit in early December but it didn't stay that way for long. Over the course of the season Yale's scoring was dreadful, averaging less than two goals a game. While the defense didn't play particularly well, it was able to keep the Bulldogs in most games. The pop-gun offense, however, could rarely take advantage.

The team played in two in-season tournaments during the year, finishing last in both. The Bulldogs also ended up dead-last in the ECAC Hockey standings and finished the year season with the second-worst PairWise ranking. Despite their lack of success, Yale did give Colgate a fight in the postseason, pushing the first game into overtime. However, just like the majority of the season, Yale couldn't find timely scoring and ended up getting swept out of the conference tournament.

Departures

Recruiting

Roster
As of August 19, 2021.

Standings

Schedule and results

|-
!colspan=12 style="" | Regular Season

|-
!colspan=12 style="" | 

|-
!colspan=12 style="" | 

|-
!colspan=12 style=";" | 

|- align="center" bgcolor="#e0e0e0"
|colspan=12|Yale Won Series 0–2

Scoring statistics

Goaltending statistics

Rankings

Note: USCHO did not release a poll in week 24.

References

2021-22
Yale
Yale
Yale
Yale